Mountz House is a historic home located at Garrett, DeKalb County, Indiana.  It was built in 1893, and is a two-story, four bay by five bay, Queen Anne style frame dwelling. It has a cross gable roof and two-story gabled wing.  It sits on a fieldstone foundation and has a pitched slate roof.  It has narrow clapboard siding and decorative diamond-shaped checkerboard pattern panels.  It features a front porch with turned posts and decorative brackets.  Also on the property is a contributing barn.

It was added to the National Register of Historic Places in 1983.

References

Houses on the National Register of Historic Places in Indiana
Queen Anne architecture in Indiana
Houses completed in 1893
Houses in DeKalb County, Indiana
National Register of Historic Places in DeKalb County, Indiana